Brigadier Donald David Graeme Hardie CVO TD KStJ (born 23 January 1936) is a Scottish businessman and retired Territorial Army officer. He was Lord Lieutenant of Dunbartonshire from 1990 to 2007. He is also an honorary vice-president of Lennox and Argyll Battalion of the Boys' Brigade, and is the Keeper of Dumbarton Castle.

Hardie was appointed Commander of the Royal Victorian Order (CVO) in 2008.

References

Living people
Royal Artillery officers
Lord-Lieutenants of Dunbartonshire
Knights of the Order of St John
Commanders of the Royal Victorian Order
Scottish businesspeople
1936 births